Ukk is a village in Veszprém county, Hungary.

Notable people
Viktor Rákosi (1860–1923), writer

References

External links 
 Street map (Hungarian)

Populated places in Veszprém County